The Antikensammlung Kiel is the collection of antiquities held by the Classical Archaeology Department of the University of Kiel, housed in nine basement rooms in the Kunsthalle Kiel. It is the only museum of its kind in the state of Schleswig-Holstein and includes internationally important collections of pottery from Magna Graecia as well as classical sculptures and casts of such sculptures.

History 

The university founded the collection in the first half of the 19th century, thanks to Peter Wilhelm Forchhammer, its first archaeology lecturer, supported by Otto Jahn. In 1840 he began raising funds for a museum of local and classical archaeology which he hoped would bring about an artistic revival in northern Germany and the following year he was given the first objects for the collection, even before the building was begun. These donations were casts of the sculptures from the Parthenon and arrived in Kiel in 1842. Kiel was then part of Denmark and Christian VIII of Denmark granted the university the main space in the chapel of Kiel Castle to turn into a cast gallery - that chapel had been destroyed by fire in 1838. It opened there on 18 January 1843. After that of the University of Bonn, it was the second archaeological collection set up in Germany or Austria and the first public art museum in northern Germany.

Directors 
The post of director is traditionally held by the head of the university's Classical Archaeology Department.

 1842–1894: Peter Wilhelm Forchhammer
 1895–1903: Arthur Milchhoefer
 1904–1907: Ferdinand Noack
 1909–1919: Bruno Sauer
 1920–1925: August Frickenhaus
 1925–1946: Eduard Schmidt
 1946–1947: Roland Hampe
 1948–1968: Wilhelm Kraiker
 1968–1990: Konrad Schauenburg
 1990–2006: Bernhard Schmaltz
 2007–2010: Frank Rumscheid
 2012–present: Annette Haug

Curators 

 since 1985: Joachim Raeder

External links
http://www.antikensammlung-kiel.de/
http://museen-sh.de/Objektsuche/%7CSuchbegriff%7CAntikensammlung%7C/

Museums in Kiel
Archaeological museums in Germany
Museums of ancient Rome in Germany
Museums of ancient Greece in Germany
Plaster cast collections